Robert Stanley Rodgerson (20 June 1894 – 22 December 1955) was an Australian rules footballer who played with Fitzroy in the Victorian Football League (VFL).

Notes

External links 

1894 births
1955 deaths
Australian rules footballers from Melbourne
Fitzroy Football Club players
People educated at Scotch College, Melbourne
People from Box Hill, Victoria